In the C Standard Library, signal processing defines how a program handles various signals while it executes. A signal can report some exceptional behavior within the program (such as division by zero), or a signal can report some asynchronous event outside the program (such as someone striking an interactive attention key on a keyboard).

Standard signals

The C standard defines only 6 signals. They are all defined in signal.h header (csignal header in C++):

SIGABRT – "abort", abnormal termination.
SIGFPE – floating point exception.
SIGILL – "illegal", invalid instruction.
SIGINT – "interrupt", interactive attention request sent to the program.
SIGSEGV – "segmentation violation", invalid memory access.
SIGTERM – "terminate", termination request sent to the program.

Additional signals may be specified in the signal.h header by the implementation. For example, Unix and Unix-like operating systems (such as Linux) define more than 15 additional signals; see Unix signal.

Debugging 
SIGTRAP for debugging purposes. It's platform-dependent and may be used on Unix-like operating systems.

Handling

A signal can be generated by calling raise() or kill() system calls. raise() sends a signal to the current process, kill() sends a signal to a specific process.

A signal handler is a function which is called by the target environment when the corresponding signal occurs. The target environment suspends execution of the program until the signal handler returns or calls longjmp().

Signal handlers can be set with signal() or sigaction(). The behavior of signal() has been changed multiple times across history and its use is discouraged. It is only portable when used to set a signal's disposition to SIG_DFL or SIG_IGN. Signal handlers can be specified for all but two signals (SIGKILL and SIGSTOP cannot be caught, blocked or ignored).

If the signal reports an error within the program (and the signal is not asynchronous), the signal handler can terminate by calling abort(), exit(), or longjmp().

Functions

Example usage

#include <signal.h>
#include <stdio.h>
#include <stdlib.h>

static void catch_function(int signo) {
    puts("Interactive attention signal caught.");
}

int main(void) {
    // Set above function as signal handler for the SIGINT signal:
    if (signal(SIGINT, catch_function) == SIG_ERR) {
        fputs("An error occurred while setting a signal handler.\n", stderr);
        return EXIT_FAILURE;
    }
    puts("Raising the interactive attention signal.");
    if (raise(SIGINT) != 0) {
        fputs("Error raising the signal.\n", stderr);
        return EXIT_FAILURE;
    }
    puts("Exiting.");
    return EXIT_SUCCESS;
    // exiting after raising signal
}

See also
Unix signal

References

C standard library